PZ may refer to:

 PZ Cussons, a manufacturer
 PZ Myers (born 1957), an evolutionary developmental biologist, professor and blogger
 Peshawar Zalmi, a cricket team franchise in Pakistan Super League
 Porphyrazine, in chemistry, a tetrapyyrolic macrocycle
 Province of Potenza, Italy
 Pozidriv, a type of screw head and screwdriver
 Pz: an EEG electrode site according to the 10-20 system
 LATAM Paraguay, an airline based in Asunción, Paraguay (IATA code PZ)